The siege of Hippo Regius was a siege from June 430 to August 431, carried out by the Vandals under their king Genseric against Roman defenders under Boniface, Count of Africa.

Having command of the sea, Boniface was able to keep the city well provisioned and, after 14 months, Genseric was the one short on supplies. The Vandals lifted the siege, making the ordeal a technical Roman victory. However, Boniface quickly abandoned the city by sea to meet with reinforcements from the eastern empire; the Vandals were able to occupy the town and subsequently defeated the combined Roman forces in a set battle.

Among those who died during the siege was St. Augustine.

References

430
430s conflicts
Hippo Regius
Hippo Regius
Annaba
430s in the Roman Empire
Vandal Kingdom
Fall of the Western Roman Empire
Military history of Algeria